Georges Bauer (29 September 1904 – 4 February 1987) was a Luxembourgian water polo player. He competed in the men's tournament at the 1928 Summer Olympics.

References

1904 births
1987 deaths
Luxembourgian male water polo players
Olympic water polo players of Luxembourg
Water polo players at the 1928 Summer Olympics
People from Differdange